Alakazam is an incantation or magic word along the lines of abracadabra.

Alakazam may also refer to:

 Alakazam (Pokémon), a Pokémon species 
 Alakazam the Great, a Japanese 1960 anime film
 "Alakazam !", a track on Justice's album Woman

See also
 The Magic Land of Allakazam, a television series from the 60's of the magician Mark Wilson